Greg Wren (born January 21, 1955) is an American politician in the Republican Party who served in the Alabama House of Representatives from Montgomery in the 75th District from 1994 to 2002 and again from 2006 to 2014.

In 2013 he obtained confidential, non-public information and sold it to RxAlly, a national company that represented the interests of member pharmacies.  In return for passing on privileged information, they paid him $24,000. He was charged with a violation of ethics and found guilty, forcing him to resign his House seat.  He was then sentenced to twelve months in jail (suspended) and fined $24,000.

References

1955 births
Living people
Politicians from Ithaca, New York
Republican Party members of the Alabama House of Representatives
Alabama politicians convicted of crimes